Yeola (Marathi pronunciation: [jeːʋlaː]) is a town, a municipal council, and a taluka headquarters in Nashik District in the Indian state of  Maharashtra.

Demographics
 India census, Yeola had a population of 43,205. Males constitute 52% of the population and females 48%. Yeola has an average literacy rate of 99%, higher than the national average of 59.5%: male literacy is 99%, and female literacy is 99%. In Yeola, 14% of the population is under 6 years of age.

Geography 
Yeola is 83  kilometres from Nasik on Nasik-Aurangabad Highway and 26  kilometres south of Manmad on the Manmad–Ahmednagar road. Yeola is 33  kilometres from Shirdi and is 260 kilometres northeast of Mumbai. It has a station on the Ahmednagar–Manmad rail route. Aurangabad Airport, Nasik/Ozar Airport, Shirdi Airport and Chhatrapati Shivaji International Airport are the nearest airports.

Notable people
 Tatya Tope
 Yadunath Thatte
 Swami Muktananda
 Lalita Pawar
 Chhagan Bhujbal

See also
 Yeola (Vidhan Sabha constituency)

References

Talukas in Maharashtra
Nashik district